Invagination is the process of a surface folding in on itself to form a cavity, pouch or tube. In developmental biology, invagination is a mechanism that takes place during gastrulation. This mechanism or cell movement happens mostly in the vegetal pole. Invagination consists of the folding of an area of the exterior sheet of cells towards the inside of the blastula. In each organism, the complexity will be different depending on the number of cells. Invagination can be referenced as one of the steps of the establishment of the body plan. The term, originally used in embryology, has been adopted in other disciplines as well. 
There is more than one type of movement for invagination. Two common types are axial and orthogonal. The difference between the production of the tube formed in the cytoskeleton and extracellular matrix. Axial can be formed at a single point along the axis of a surface. Orthogonal is linear and trough.

Biology
 Invagination is the morphogenetic processes by which an embryo takes form, and is the initial step of gastrulation, the massive reorganization of the embryo from a simple spherical ball of cells, the blastula, into a multi-layered organism, with differentiated germ layers: endoderm, mesoderm, and ectoderm.  More localized invaginations also occur later in embryonic development,
 The inner membrane of a mitochondrion invaginates to form cristae, thus providing a much greater surface area to accommodate the protein complexes and other participants that produce adenosine triphosphate (ATP). 
 Invagination occurs during endocytosis and exocytosis when a vesicle forms within the cell and the membrane closes around it.
 Invagination of a part of the intestine into another part is called intussusception.

Amphioxus

The invagination in Amphioxus is the first cell movement of gastrulation. This process was first described by Conklin. During gastrulation, the blastula will be transformed by the invagination. The endoderm will fold towards the inner part and that way the blastocoel will be gone transforming into a cup-shaped structure with a double wall. The inner wall will be called the archenteron; the primitive gut. The archenteron will open to the exterior through the blastopore. The outer wall will become the ectoderm. Later forming the epidermis and neural crest.

Tunicates
In tunicates, invagination is the first mechanism that takes place during gastrulation. The four largest endoderm cells induce the invagination process in the tunicates. Invagination consists of the internal movements of a sheet of cells (the endoderm) based on changes in their shape. The blastula of the tunicates is a little flattened in the vegetal pole making a change of shape from a columnar to a wedge shape. Once the endoderm cells were invaginated, the cells will keep moving beneath the ectoderm. Later, the blastopore will be formed and with this, the invagination process is complete. The blastopore will be surrounded by the mesoderm by all sides.

References

Cellular processes
Developmental biology